Gilla Cóemáin mac Gilla Samthainde was a Medieval Irish poet (fl. 1072).

He was author of Annálad anall uile, a poem of fifty-eight quatrains, and a number of other works. Some of his works were incorporated into Lebor Gabála Érenn.

References

 Gilla Cóemáin's chronological poem, in The tripartite Life of Patrick (ed. and trans. by Whitley Stokes, London, 1887.
 Book of Leinster iii, pp. 496–503, Dublin, 1957.
 Three poems ascribed to Gilla Cóemáin: a critical edition, DPhil diss (Oxford, 1996), Dr. Peter J. Smith. 
 Three Poems Ascribed to Gilla Cóemáin: A Critical Edition of the Work of an Eleventh-Century Irish Scholar, Peter J. Smith, Münster, 2008.
 Vikings in Ireland and Scotland in the Ninth Century, Donnchadh Ó Corráin, Peritia 12, 1996.

Irish scribes
Medieval European scribes
11th-century Irish poets
Irish male poets
Irish-language writers